Major-General Ian Helstrip Baker CBE (26 November 1927 – 28 July 2005) was a British Army officer who became Assistant Chief of the General Staff.

Military career
Educated at St Peter's School, York, and St Edmund Hall, Oxford, Baker was commissioned into the Royal Artillery in 1948. He served in Malaya from 1960 to 1962 during the Malayan Emergency. He was appointed commanding officer of 1st Royal Tank Regiment in 1967, Commander of 7th Armoured Brigade in 1972 and Assistant Chief of the General Staff in 1978. He went on to be General Officer Commanding North East District in 1980 before retiring in 1982. He was also Colonel Commandant of the Royal Tank Regiment from 1981 to 1986.

In retirement he became Secretary and Head of Administration at University College London.

Family
In 1956 he married Susan (Sally) Lock; they had two sons and a daughter.

References

|-
 

1927 births
2005 deaths
British Army major generals
People educated at St Peter's School, York
Alumni of St Edmund Hall, Oxford
Royal Artillery officers
Commanders of the Order of the British Empire
British Army personnel of the Malayan Emergency